The Statistical Society of Australia (SSA) is the main professional organization for statisticians and related professionals in Australia. It was founded in 1962 to support and unify the work of Australian state statistical societies that were already in existence and had about 800 members in 2019. It has its own publishing arm, the Australian Statistical Publishing Association Inc. Its main publication is The Australian and New Zealand Journal of Statistics. The society currently has six state branches: Canberra, New South Wales, Queensland, South Australia, Victoria and Western Australia.

The SSA is an affiliated organisation of the International Statistical Institute.

The Society awards a gold medal, the Pitman Medal, at most once annually. It recognizes outstanding achievement in, and contribution to, the discipline of statistics. The Society runs the Australian Statistical Conference, which is held biennially over five days.

Recipients of the Pitman Medal

1978 – E. J. G. Pitman
1980 – H.O. Lancaster
1982 – P. A. P. Moran
1986 – Edward J. Hannan
1988 – Chris Heyde
1990 – Peter Gavin Hall
1992 – A. James
1993 – E.J. Williams
1994 – J.M. Gani
1996 – W.J. Ewens
1998 – Eugene Seneta
2000 – G.N. Wilkinson

2002 – Terry Speed
2004 – Adrian Baddeley
2005 – J. Darroch
2006 – D.J. Daley
2008 – John Robinson
2010 – Geoffrey McLachlan
2012 – Alan Welsh
2013 – Matthew P Wand
2014 – Noel Cressie
2016 – Kerrie Mengersen
2018 – Louise Ryan
2021 – Rob J. Hyndman
 
(source)

References

External links
 Statistical Society of Australia
 Pitman Medal
 Facebook: Statistical Society of Australia
 MacTutor History of Mathematics: Statistical Society of Australia
 Encyclopedia of Australian Science: Statistical Society of Australia

Professional associations based in Australia